John Mills (22 December 17548 July 1796) was an officer in the United States Army who served as acting Adjutant General and acting Inspector General of the U.S. Army from 1794 to 1796.

See also 
List of Adjutants General of the U.S. Army
List of Inspectors General of the U.S. Army

References 

1754 births
1796 deaths
Adjutants general of the United States Army
American people of the Northwest Indian War
Inspectors General of the United States Army
Continental Army officers from Massachusetts
People from colonial Boston
Burials in Ohio